Mark Wesley Dennard (born November 2, 1955) is a former American football center in the National Football League (NFL). He was drafted by the Miami Dolphins in the 10th round of the 1978 NFL Draft. He played college football at Texas A&M.

Dennard also played for the Philadelphia Eagles and Cleveland Browns.

References

1955 births
Living people
American football centers
Texas A&M Aggies football players
Miami Dolphins players
Philadelphia Eagles players
Cleveland Browns players
People from Bay City, Texas
Players of American football from Texas